Anna Karenina is a 1920 German silent historical film, directed by Frederic Zelnik and starring Lya Mara, Johannes Riemann, and Heinrich Peer. It is an adaptation of Leo Tolstoy's 1877 novel Anna Karenina. It premiered at the Marmorhaus in Berlin.

Plot summary

Cast

References

Bibliography

External links
 

1920 films
1920s historical drama films
German historical drama films
Films of the Weimar Republic
Films directed by Frederic Zelnik
German silent feature films
Films based on Anna Karenina
German black-and-white films
1920s German films
Silent historical drama films